A kelong (or kellong) is an offshore platform built predominantly with wood, which can be found in waters off Malaysia, the Philippines and Indonesia. Only a handful remain around Singapore due to rapid urbanisation.

Kelongs are built by fishermen primarily for fishing or fish farming purposes, although larger structures can also function as dwellings for them and their families.

Structurally, kelongs are often built without the need for nails, using rattan to bind tree trunks and wooden planks together. The decks of some kelongs have open spaces with nets that hang partially in the water, allowing for captured fish to be kept live until they are sold or cooked. Anchored into the sea bed using wooden piles of about 20 m in length and driven about six metres into the sea, they are usually sited in shallow water, although some can be found in deeper waters. Some kelongs are less isolated and are connected to land via a wooden gangway. Other variants of kelongs can be mobile, with some portion of the building floating freely. Some buildings are large, being made up of groups of kelongs joined together into a massive offshore community.

Singapore 

Kelongs can be found in the northeastern coastal areas.

References 

Architecture in Malaysia
Architecture in Singapore
Fishing in Asia
Coastal construction
Architecture in Indonesia
Architecture in the Philippines
Stilt houses